Pomo (Pomo for "Those who live at red earth hole") is an unincorporated community in Mendocino County, California.

A post office operated at Pomo from 1870 to 1871, from 1872 to 1881, and from 1882 to 1911.

It is named after a village of the Pomo people, itself named Pomo, which stood nearby.

References

Unincorporated communities in California
Unincorporated communities in Mendocino County, California